Yermolino is a rural locality (a village) in Rostilovskoye Rural Settlement, Gryazovetsky District, Vologda Oblast, Russia. The population was 24 as of 2002.

Geography 
Yermolino is located 23 km south of Gryazovets (the district's administrative centre) by road. Kokarevo is the nearest rural locality.

References 

Rural localities in Gryazovetsky District